Ampeloglypter ater, the grape cane girdler, is a true weevil species in the genus Ampeloglypter. It is a pest infecting grapevine.

References

External links

Baridinae
Beetles described in 1876
Grape pest insects